The Reapers Stakes was an American Thoroughbred horse race run annually at Sheepshead Bay Race Track in Sheepshead Bay, Brooklyn. Held in September, the race was open to three-year-olds of either sex. It was run on dirt over a distance of 1 3/16 miles except for 1903 when it was set at 1 3/8 miles.

On June 19, 1880 the Sheepshead Bay facility hosted its first day of Thoroughbred racing. Success made the addition of more stakes races possible and in 1887 the Reapers Stakes had its inaugural running. That race was won by Belvidere, a colt owned by the Preakness Stables of James Galway, a successful wholesaler of grocery store products and a Steward of The Jockey Club. The final running took place in 1907 and was won by the 20:1 outsider, Blue Book.

Demise of the Reapers Stakes 
After years of uncertainty, on June 11, 1908 the Republican controlled New York Legislature under Governor Charles Evans Hughes passed the Hart–Agnew anti-betting legislation with penalties allowing for fines and up to a year in prison. The owners of Sheepshead Bay Race Track, and other racing facilities in New York State, struggled to stay in business without income from betting. Racetrack operators had no choice but to drastically reduce the purse money being paid out which resulted in the Reapers Stakes being dropped from the 1908 schedule to enable a redistribution of funds to the most high-profile races. Further restrictive legislation was passed by the New York Legislature in 1910 which deepened the financial crisis for track operators and led to a complete shut down of racing across the state during 1911 and 1912. When a Court ruling saw racing return in 1913 it was too late for the Sheepshead Bay horse racing facility and it never reopened.

Records
Speed record: (new track record)
 1:59.40 – Heno (1902)

Most wins by a jockey:
 3 – Fred Taral (1891, 1896, 1898)

Most wins by a trainer:
 2 – John W. Rogers (1889, 1894)
 2 – Charles Littlefield Sr. (1898, 1901)

Most wins by an owner:
 2 – Preakness Stables (1887, 1897)
 2 – Rancocas Stable (1892, 1900)
 2 – Charles Littlefield Sr. (1898, 1901)

Winners

References

Flat horse races for three-year-olds
Discontinued horse races in New York City
Sheepshead Bay Race Track
Recurring sporting events established in 1887
Recurring sporting events disestablished in 1907
1887 establishments in New York (state)
1907 disestablishments in New York (state)